Amrutham Dhvitheeyam is an Indian Telugu-language sitcom web television series created by Gunnam Gangaraju  and directed by Gunnam Sandeep. It is a standalone sequel to the television sitcom Amrutham (2001–2007). It was released with the tagline Moorkhatvaniki maranam raadu. The series featured Harsha Vardhan, L. B. Sriram, Satya  Vasu Inturi, Sivannarayana Naripeddi, Krishnan, Ragini in the main roles. It premiered on ZEE5 from 25 March 2020 and ended on 25 March 2021.

Overall synopsis 
Amrutham, along with his friend, Anji, runs a restaurant named Amruta Vilas which is legally owned by Appaji and dreams of making it successful. However, the duo's attempts at improving their business fail, resulting in hilarious situations.

Cast

Main 

 Harsha Vardhan as Icchapurapu Ksheera Sagara Panchamrutha Rao "Amrutham"
 L. B. Sriram as Amudala Anjaneyulu aka Anji
 Sivannarayana as Gongali Appaji aka Appaji
 Vasu Inturi as Sarveswaran aka Saravam
 Ragini as Shanta
 Satya Krishnan as  Sanjeevani "Sanju"
 Kasi Viswanath as Parandhamayya, Amrutham's father in law
Raghava as Rubber Balaji, Amrutham's cousin brother

Recurring 

 Aanamolu Surya Teja as Jootha Manager
 Sanjay Reddy as Venture Capalist
 Gajula Sandeep as Assistant
Getup Srinu
Chandrasekar Azad
Pappu
Rajashree as food blogger
Muralikrishnam Raju
Koduru Subrahmanyam
Masthan
Madhulika
Prasad
Sai Kiran Yadav
Kathri Yogi
N. Sridhar Reddy
Naveen
Jabardasth Sunny
Auto Ram Prasad
Abhishek Maharshi
Kovvuri Srinivas Reddy
Ansala
Nekkanti Madhu
Edidha Sai Kiran
Surya
 Gunnam Ayathi
Tanishq
Riteish
Bhanu
Gunnam Vibha
Thagubothu Ramesh
Hari Babu
Satyam Annamareddy
Sankara Mahanthi
Priyadarsini as Sanjeevan's mother

Production

Development 
The first season Amrutham was highly rated and was one of the most viewed television sitcoms of Indian television of the time. Due to its immense popularity the series was re-telecasted on ETV Plus from 2016 to 2018. Even during its re-telecast, the series got decent viewership. Gunnam Sandeep, then decided to direct the sequel to the series in 2018 with new stories but with the same concept.

Casting 
Harsha Vardhan, Ragini, Vasu Inturi and Sivannarayana Naripeddi are the only actors who reprised their roles. Due to the death of Gundu Hanumantha Rao, his role was replaced by L. B. Sriram. Satya Krishnan and Kasi Viswanath were chosen for the main roles. Kasi Viswanath replaced senior actor Devadas Kanakala who played the role of Amrutham's father in-law.

Principal photography 
The series was finally announced in late 2019. Essel Group has announced that it is going to produce along with Gunnam Urmila and release it on ZEE5. First three episodes were filmed in the early 2020. Due to COVID-19 pandemic, filming was paused until August. Next two episodes were shot digitally and were marketed as lockdown specials. Filming was resumed in August 2020. Majority of the scenes were shot at Annapurna Studios and Ramanaidu Studios in Hyderabad.

Music 
Title track is composed by Kalyan Malik and the background score is by Ajay Arasada.

Episodes

Release 
The official trailer of the series was released on 12 March 2020 announcing that it will be premiered from 25 March 2020 on ZEE5. The trailer was released by noted director S. S. Rajamouli.

Reception 
IndiaGlitz wrote that "The new avatar of 'Amrutham' makes for an enjoyable ride.  The characters retain their quintessential qualities and the actors showcase their performative skills with ease.  The vibe is nostalgic."

References

External links 
 
 Amrutham Dhvitheeyam on ZEE5

2020 Indian television series debuts
ZEE5 original programming
Telugu-language web series
Indian comedy television series
Indian television spin-offs
2021 Indian television series endings
Indian comedy web series
Indian drama web series
Indian television sitcoms